Music Hub was a cloud-based music service launched by Samsung. It allowed users to listen to music from a variety of Samsung devices. According to its website, it wanted to create an integrated mobile and web service for listening to music.

History
On May 9, 2012, mSpot published a press release, where it stated that it had been acquired by Samsung Electronics. This was followed by a subsequent press release noting the official launch of Music Hub by Samsung. Samsung Music shut down on July 1, 2014, which resulted in the dissolution of the Samsung Music Hub.

Availability
Initially, the service was launched in Germany, France, Spain, Italy, and the UK. The service was available on the Samsung Galaxy S III and Samsung Galaxy Note II, with initial reports suggesting a wider launch was intended.

Competition
Reports suggest that Samsung may have created the service in order to compete with other companies such as Google and Amazon in the cloud-based streaming music market. Some also note its similarity to other music services such as Spotify.

References

External links
Samsung Incallui Functions
Fakaza MP3 Music Website

Music Hub